Prairie Elk Colony is a Hutterite community and census-designated place (CDP) in McCone County, Montana, United States. It is on the northern edge of the county, just south of the Missouri River, which forms the county line.

The community was first listed as a CDP prior to the 2020 census.

Demographics

References 

Census-designated places in McCone County, Montana
Census-designated places in Montana
Hutterite communities in the United States